Gilberto Muñoz (3 January 1923 – 18 December 1998) was a Chilean footballer. He played in six matches for the Chile national football team in 1949. He was also part of Chile's squad for the 1949 South American Championship.

References

External links
 

1923 births
1998 deaths
Chilean footballers
Chile international footballers
Footballers from Santiago
Colo-Colo footballers
Association football midfielders